Cockburn Sound was an electoral district of the Legislative Assembly in the Australian state of Western Australia from 1901 to 1904.

Located south of Fremantle, the district existed for one term. In that time, it was represented by Opposition politician Francis McDonald.

Members

Election results

Cockburn Sound
1901 establishments in Australia
Cockburn Sound
1904 disestablishments in Australia
Cockburn Sound